Kerala State Beverages (Manufacturing & Marketing) Corporation Ltd (BEVCO) is a public sector company fully owned by the Government of Kerala, it started under civil supplies department at that time under the  minister N Sreenivasan (excise minister), K Karunakaran  Ministry. Since then BEVCO has the authority under law for the wholesale and retail vending of alcohol in Kerala. It controls the retail sales of Indian Made Foreign Liquor (IMFL) and beer in the state.

History
As per recommendation of a judicial commission, Kerala Government in 1984 amended the Abkari Act and set up a Public Sector Corporation to procure spirit and arrange blending, bottling, sealing and distribution of arrack and sale of IMFL throughout the State of  Kerala.

Research by a Kochi-based think tank had suggested liberalization of India's liquor industry to facilitate entry of foreign players, considering the  growth of sales in imported spirits across the country. According to think tank CPPR, the liquor market in India is the third largest  and fastest growing one in the world . A significant part of this liquor demand is met by domestic production. However, the market operates under the strict regulatory framework of the government and this has led to corruption, cronyism, exorbitant prices, black-marketing and public health concerns, thereby affecting the liquor quality.

Organisation

KSBC is one of the most profitable public sector units in Kerala. The company is headed by a board with six members. The territory along with it sales and warehousing is divided into three regions by the corporation. Each region is headed by a Regional Manager. KSBC has had record sales during Onam, Christmas & New Year with Chalakudi reporting the highest sales and Badiadka being the second Incidentally Chalakudi records an average daily sale of Rs. 5-7 lakhs. Rum and brandy together account for 94% of KSBC sales in Kerala. Kerala is the largest consumer of rum in India.

KSBC is having 23 Warehouses( FL-9 Shops) and 270 Retail Outlets (FL-1 Shops) throughout Kerala.

Social impact

With one of the highest per capita consumption of alcohol in India, alcohol-related problems are on the rise, even the President of India expressed deep concern over the rising demand for alcohol in Kerala.

See also
TASMAC

References

External links

Official Website

Drink companies of India
Alcohol in Kerala
Alcohol monopolies
Government-owned companies of Kerala
Companies based in Thiruvananthapuram
Food and drink companies established in 1984
Indian companies established in 1984
1984 establishments in Kerala